Kavitha Ranjini, known by the stage name Urvashi, is an Indian actress, dubbing artist, television host, scriptwriter and producer known for her works in the Southern film industry, predominantly in Malayalam and Tamil films. She has acted in total 300+ films: 141+ Malayalam, 125+ Tamil, 26+ Telugu, 32+Kannada and 2 Hindi films

She started her acting career as a child artist, in a Malayalam movie Kathirmandapam, released in 1979. Her first released film as heroine was Mundhanai Mudichu (Tamil, directed by K. Bhagyaraj) in 1983. She was a prominent lead actress of the 1980s and 1990s, primarily in Malayalam Films. She has written the films Ulsavamelam and Pidakkozhi Koovunna Noottandu, the latter was also produced by her. She won the National Film Award for Best Supporting Actress for her performance in Achuvinte Amma (2005), which was her comeback film after a hiatus of 6 years. She has won the Kerala State Film Award for Best Actress a record five times, which includes three consecutive wins from 1989 to 1991. She has also received two Tamil Nadu State Film Awards.

Urvashi was born to popular drama actors Chavara V. P. Nair and Vijayalakshmi in Sooranad in Kollam district of Kerala .Her elder sisters are actors Kalaranjini and Kalpana. She married actor Manoj K. Jayan on 2 May 1998, which ended in divorce in 2008.

Filmography

As actress

Malayalam films

Tamil films

Kannada films

Telugu films

Hindi films

Voice credit

In other roles

Television career

See also
 List of awards and nominations received by Urvashi

References

Indian filmographies